E444 may refer to:
 Sucrose acetate isobutyrate, a food additive
 FS Class E444, an Italian locomotive